Redmonds is a Gaelic Athletic Association club based in Cork in County Cork, Ireland. The club is situated in Tower Street, on the southside of the city. The club participates in Cork GAA competitions and in Seandún divisional board competitions. The club no longer fields hurling teams but continues to participate in the Seandun junior C football competitions.

History

Redmonds GAA have been in the Senior Hurling Championship Finals 10 times from their first finals appearance in 1892 to their last finals appearance in 1927. They won the title five times in 1892, 1900, 1901, 1915 and 1917. In the early years of the Gaelic Athletic Association clubs represented their county in the All-Ireland championships. Therefore, Redmonds were the Cork representatives on several occasions, and in 1892 were All-Ireland Senior Hurling Championship winners. One time regulars at senior level they lasted played in the top grade during the 1937 Cork Senior Hurling Championship.

Honours
All-Ireland Senior Hurling Championship: 1
 1892
Cork Senior Club Hurling Championships: 5
 1892, 1900, 1901, 1915, 1917
Cork Senior Club Hurling Championship Finalists: 10
 1892, 1893, 1899, 1900, 1901, 1912, 1915, 1917, 1924, 1927
Cork Intermediate Hurling Championships: 1
1913   Beaten Finalists 1912
Cork Junior Hurling Championships: 5
1897, 1898, 1899, 1900, 1909  Beaten Finalists 1896, 1905, 1906

Notable players
 Connie Sheehan
 Morgan Madden
 Dave McGrath
 John Kenneally
 James Keegan
 Con O'Callaghan
 Denis O'Keeffe
 Michael Casserly
 Paddy Cantillon
 Tom Irwin
 Bill O'Callaghan
 Bill Fitzgibbon
 James Conway
 Charlie McCarthy

References

Gaelic games clubs in County Cork
Hurling clubs in County Cork